Cirrhaea loddigesii is a species of orchid endemic to Brazil.

References

External links

loddigesii
Endemic orchids of Brazil